Woodstock was a provincial electoral district for the Legislative Assembly of New Brunswick, Canada.

Members of the Legislative Assembly

Election results

Woodstock

Carleton South

References

External links 
Website of the Legislative Assembly of New Brunswick

Former provincial electoral districts of New Brunswick
Woodstock, New Brunswick